Astragalus balearicus, commonly known as the Balearic milkvetch or gatovell, is a small legume of the genus Astragalus that is found on the Balearic Islands off the coast of Spain.

Description

Astragalus balearicus is a small rotund bush with dense leafy foliage.

Etymology and taxonomy
Astragalus balearicus was first described by Arthur Oliver Chater in 1968. Assigned to the genus Astragalus, derived from the Greek , Chater gave it a geographical epithet due to its prevalence on the Belearic islands. The species is similar to Astragalus massiliensis which is found in Sardinia, from which it probably diverged at the end of the Oligocene when the islands separated from mainland France.

Distribution and habitat
The legume is endemic to Mallorca and Minorca in the Mediterranean Sea, where the cushion-like thorns of the plant create a landscape typical of the islands. It is particularly abundant in the Serra de Tramuntana. 

It prefers dry, windy, particularly exposed mountainous or coastal, environments which have deep calcareous soils. It is found with species like Paeonia cambessedesii. The species is considered to be of Least Concern in the IUCN Red List.

See also
 Wildlife of Spain

References

balearicus
Endemic flora of Spain
Plants described in 1968